Bithynia pauli is a species of small freshwater snail with a gill and an operculum, an aquatic prosobranch gastropod mollusc in the family Bithyniidae.

Distribution 
This species occurs in:
 The Balearic Islands

References

Bithyniidae
Gastropods described in 2007
Endemic fauna of the Balearic Islands